The Skerries comprise three small, rocky islands  offshore from the mouth of the Wingan River, in East Gippsland, Victoria, Australia.

The islands are part of Croajingolong National Park.  They are the site of a significant Australian fur seal colony, with an estimated 14,000 seals (12.4% of the population) in 2010.

References

Islands of Victoria (Australia)
Uninhabited islands of Australia